Aiye  is an Indian Bollywood social family film. It was released in 1949. Produced and directed by Yakub under Indian Productions banner, it had music by Nashad. The film had Sulochana Chatterjee, Noor Mohammed Charlie, Masood, Jankidas, Sheela Naik, Ashraf Khan and Yakub starring in it. The film was commercially unsuccessful and Yakub called it the "big mistake" of his life.

Cast
 Yakub
 Sulochana Chatterji
 Noor Mohammed Charlie
 Jankidas
 Masood
 Shantarin
 Ashraf Khan
 Sheela Naik

Soundtrack
The music was composed by Nashad (Shaukat Dehlvi) with lyrics by Nakhshab Jarachvi and S. H. Bihari. The singers were Lata Mangeshkar, Mubarak Begum, G. M. Durrani and Nashad The film was a debut singing venture for Mubarak Begum where Nashad gave her two songs, the solo "Mohe Aane Lagi Angdai", and a duet with Lata Mangeshkar "Aaiye Aao Chalen Chalen Wahan".

Song List

References

External links
 

1949 films
1940s Hindi-language films
Films scored by Nashad
Indian black-and-white films